379th may refer to:

379th Aero Squadron, training unit assigned to Benbrook Field, former World War I military airfield, 0.5 miles north of Benbrook, Texas
379th Air Expeditionary Wing (379 AEW) is a provisional United States Air Force unit assigned to Air Combat Command
379th Bombardment Squadron, inactive United States Air Force unit
379th Expeditionary Operations Group, provisional United States Air Force unit assigned to the United States Air Forces Central
379th Fighter Squadron, inactive United States Air Force unit

See also
379 (number)
379, the year 379 (CCCLXXIX) of the Julian calendar
379 BC